Jia Le Channel is a 24-hour Chinese and Hokkien language/dialect television network, broadcasting on the Singtel TV IPTV television service. Its content includes Chinese and Hokkien language programming, as well as foreign programs targeted at Chinese viewers. Jia Le Channel available Broadcast in Singapore via Singtel TV on Channel 502 and Jia Le Channel Video On Demand.

Taiwan programs
 型男大主厨 / Stylish Man
 超级夜总会 / Super Nightclub
 超級紅人榜 / Top Singers
 炮仔聲 / The Sound Of Happiness 
 在一起，就好 / Stand By Me

Mainland China programs

 爸爸回來了 2 / Dad Came Back 2
 让世界听见 / Hear Us
 谈判官 / The Negotiator
 独步天下 / Rule The World

Singapore programs
 你是福建人吗? / Are You Hokkien? 
 你是福建人吗? 2 / Are You Hokkien? 2

Availability

External links

Programme Guide

Upcoming program

2011 establishments in Singapore
Direct broadcast satellite services
Cable television companies
Satellite television
Television channels and stations established in 2011